James McMillan was a Scottish footballer who played in the Football League for Notts County.

References

Year of birth unknown
Date of death unknown
Scottish footballers
Notts County F.C. players
English Football League players
Association football defenders